Chvalnov-Lísky is a municipality in Kroměříž District in the Zlín Region of the Czech Republic. It has about 200 inhabitants.

Administrative parts
The municipality is made up of villages of Chvalnov and Lísky.

References

Villages in Kroměříž District